Jean-François de Sart (born 18 December 1961 at Waremme) is a former Belgian football player. He is the former coach of the Belgium national under-21 football team and has last worked as Director of football for Standard Liège. While at R.F.C. de Liège he helped them win the 1989–90 Belgian Cup, and he also won the 1992–93 Belgian First Division title while at Anderlecht.

He also works part-time as a football pundit on Belgian television.

He is the father of Julien De Sart and Alexis De Sart, both represented Standard Liège at Youth and Senior level, with Julien playing in the English Championship for Middlesbrough until 2018.

Playing career
1979–1991: R.F.C. de Liège
1991–1993: R.S.C. Anderlecht
1993–1995: R.F.C. de Liège
He earned 3 caps for the Belgium national football team

References

External links
 
 

1961 births
Living people
People from Waremme
Belgian footballers
Belgium international footballers
1990 FIFA World Cup players
RFC Liège players
R.S.C. Anderlecht players
Belgian football managers
Belgian Pro League players
Association football defenders
Footballers from Liège Province